Roberto Carlos Guizasola la Rosa (born 21 August 1984) is a Peruvian retired footballer who played as a right back. He is the younger brother of Guillermo Guizasola.

Club career
Guizasola made his debut for Alianza Lima on February 11, 2003 against Olimpia in the group stage of the Copa Libertadores. He entered match in the 46th minute for Guillermo Salas, and the match finished in a 1-1 draw.

On 2 February 2020, Guizasola announced his retirement from football.

International career
He was called up to play in Sergio Markarian's first game as coach of Peru. This game was played in Toronto on September 4, 2010 against Canada. Guizasola played the whole match which finished 2-0 in favor of Peru.

Career statistics

International

Honours

Club
Alianza Lima
 Torneo Descentralizado (3): 2003, 2004, 2006

Juan Aurich
 Torneo Descentralizado (1): 2011

References

External links 

1984 births
Living people
Footballers from Lima
Peruvian footballers
Peru international footballers
Peruvian expatriate footballers
Peruvian Primera División players
Club Alianza Lima footballers
Coronel Bolognesi footballers
Sport Áncash footballers
Cienciano footballers
Juan Aurich footballers
Rosario Central footballers
Sport Huancayo footballers
Universidad Técnica de Cajamarca footballers
Expatriate footballers in Argentina
Peruvian expatriate sportspeople in Argentina
Association football fullbacks